The St. Clair Energy Centre is a natural gas power station in St. Clair, Ontario. The facility is owned by St Clair Power LP, a joint venture between Invenergy and the hedge fund Stark Investments, and operated by Invenergy Services Canada.

The plant was built in response to the Government of Ontario's 2004 initiative to produce lower-emission electricity, and has a 20-year contract from the Ontario Power Authority to provide electricity to the provincial power grid. The plant was partially built from equipment originally intended four-unit CCGT in Nelson Township, IL.

Description
The plant consists of:
 Two GE 7FA combustion turbines
 Two General Electric A10 steam turbines

References

Natural gas-fired power stations in Ontario
Buildings and structures in Sarnia
Energy infrastructure completed in 2009